Rasaq Oladimeji Bello (born 19 August 1984) is a Nigerian professional footballer, who plays for Aryan as a centre back in the Calcutta Football League.

Career
He first established himself in Indian football while playing for United SC. He contributed a lot to the  success of United SC during 2012–14. The high point of, which came in 2012 when the club lifted the IFA Shield by defeating East Bengal 1–0. United Sports Club has been under severe financial constraint in 2013–14 and Bello along with the other team mates, decided to carry on for the sake of the team. They practically played without salary for the most of the season and saved relegation in the 2013–14 I league. For the 2014–15 season, Bello joined in Mohun Bagan and played a key role in Mohun Bagan's i-League triumph. Bello scored his first goal for Mohun Bagan A.C. in the last fixture of the 2014-15 I-League season against Bengaluru FC. His header only three minutes from time handed Mohun Bagan their fourth national league title. For 2015–16 season, he switched over to the other Kolkata giant East Bengal F.C., the main rival of Mohun Bagan.

Honours

Mohun Bagan 
 I-League: 2014–15

References

1984 births
Living people
Nigerian footballers
Nigerian expatriate footballers
I-League players
Expatriate footballers in India
Nigerian expatriate sportspeople in India
Chirag United Club Kerala players
United SC players
Mohun Bagan AC players
Association football central defenders
Fransa-Pax FC players
Sporting Clube de Goa players
Mahindra United FC players
Tollygunge Agragami FC players
East Bengal Club players
Gokulam Kerala FC players
Aryan FC players
Nigeria youth international footballers